Rubén Epitié-Dyowe Roig (born 5 February 1983), known as Epitié, is an Equatoguinean retired footballer who played as a forward.

Club career
Born in Manresa, Barcelona, Catalonia, Epitié spent the vast majority of his senior career in Spain, but never appeared in higher than the third division.

He represented CE Manresa, FC Andorra, CD La Oliva, ACD San Marcial, CD Logroñés, Jerez Industrial CF, Algeciras CF, AD Mar Menor-San Javier, CF Peralada, UD Poblense, CD Binéfar, CF Vilanova (sharing teams with sibling Juan in the latter), CD Montcada, CF Igualada, UE Rubí, CE Europa and UE Castelldefels.

International career
As many players born in Spain, Epitié chose to represent Equatorial Guinea through ancestry – his father hailed from that country, while his mother was Spanish. He made his senior debut in 2006.

Personal life
Epitié's older brother, Juan, was also a footballer – and a forward. He too spent most of his professional career in Spain, and also appeared for Equatorial Guinea internationally.

References

External links
 
 
 

1983 births
Living people
Footballers from Manresa
Citizens of Equatorial Guinea through descent
Equatoguinean sportspeople of Spanish descent
Equatoguinean people of Catalan descent
Spanish footballers
Equatoguinean footballers
Association football forwards
Segunda División B players
Tercera División players
Divisiones Regionales de Fútbol players
CE Manresa players
FC Andorra players
CD Logroñés footballers
Jerez Industrial CF players
Algeciras CF footballers
CF Peralada players
CD Binéfar players
UE Rubí players
CE Europa footballers
Equatorial Guinea international footballers
Spanish expatriate footballers
Equatoguinean expatriate footballers
Expatriate footballers in Andorra
Spanish expatriate sportspeople in Andorra
Equatoguinean expatriate sportspeople in Andorra